Vasiliy Yegorovich Savinkov (born 1 February 1937) is a Soviet middle-distance runner. He competed in the men's 800 metres at the 1960 Summer Olympics.

References

External links
 

1937 births
Living people
Athletes (track and field) at the 1960 Summer Olympics
Soviet male middle-distance runners
Olympic athletes of the Soviet Union
Place of birth missing (living people)